Şahinkaya is a Turkish name meaning "buzzard rock". It may refer to the following people and places:

People
Tahsin Şahinkaya (1925-2013), Turkish Air Force general
Hayrullah Şahinkaya (born 1934), Turkish wrestler
Coşkun Şahinkaya (born 1942), Turkish footballer
Bülent Şahinkaya (1948-2009), Turkish footballer
Güngör Şahinkaya (born 1954), Turkish footballer
Levent Sahinkaya (born 1959), Turkish ambassador

Places
 Şahinkaya, Çorum
 Şahinkaya, Elazığ, a quarter of the city Elazığ, Turkey
 Şahinkaya, Sındırgı, a village in Turkey

Turkish-language surnames